A pocket comparator is an optical device for measuring and inspection comprising a loupe and a reticle. The instrument was developed and manufactured by the Bell & Howell Company, but similar instruments of other names are made by other manufacturers.

It is used for:
 Linear measurements in fractions of an inch
 Circular measurements in fractions of an inch
 Radius measurements
 Angle measurements
 Narrow line width measurements
 Circular measurements in decimals of an inch
 Linear measurements in inches
 Linear measurements in millimeters

Measurements are performed by bringing the surface of the reticle as close as possible to the work inspected.

References

Measuring instruments
Magnifiers
Articles containing video clips